Jerzy Paweł Gorgoń (born 18 July 1949 in Zabrze) is a Polish former football player who is remembered for his participation in the 1972 Summer Olympics. He was a 6'4" tall central defender, who became well known in 1967 while playing for Górnik Zabrze. He helped Zabrze to five consecutive Polish Cups in 1968–72. Gorgoń participated in the 1974 World Cup in, then, West Germany, winning third place with the Poland National Team and being his squad's defensive pillar. 

He won 55 international caps overall, and took on the role of captaincy once. He also played in the 1976 Summer Olympics in Montreal,

Gorgoń moved to Argentina in 1978. He had a mostly unsuccessful time there and moved to Switzerland in 1980 to play for FC Gallen. He later coached the reserve and youth teams of Blau-Weiss St. Gallen as well as at the football academy in Gossau.

References

1949 births
Living people
Polish footballers
Polish expatriate footballers
Poland international footballers
Górnik Zabrze players
FC St. Gallen players
Footballers at the 1972 Summer Olympics
Footballers at the 1976 Summer Olympics
Olympic footballers of Poland
Olympic gold medalists for Poland
Olympic silver medalists for Poland
1974 FIFA World Cup players
1978 FIFA World Cup players
Ekstraklasa players
Olympic medalists in football
Sportspeople from Zabrze
Medalists at the 1976 Summer Olympics
Medalists at the 1972 Summer Olympics
Association football defenders
Expatriate footballers in Switzerland
Polish expatriate sportspeople in Switzerland